Casino Lisboa may refer to:

 Casino Lisboa (Macau)
 Casino Lisboa (Portugal)